Llangefni Town Football Club are a Welsh football team based in Llangefni on Anglesey. They play in the Ardal NW which is in the third tier of the Welsh football pyramid.

Llangefni Town competed for a single season in the Welsh Premier League in the 2007–08 season and are former members of now defunct Cymru Alliance between 1999 and 2012.

Stadium 
Isgraig (1897–2000)
 Cae Bob Parry (2000–present)

The club's ground was chosen to host several matches during the 2019 Inter Games Football Tournament.

References

External links
 Club website
 Facebook
 Twitter

Football clubs in Wales
Association football clubs established in 1897
Sport in Anglesey
1897 establishments in Wales
Llangefni
Cymru Premier clubs
Cymru Alliance clubs
Welsh Alliance League clubs
Gwynedd League clubs
Cymru North clubs
Anglesey League clubs
Ardal Leagues clubs